"My Soul Pleads For You" is the second single released from Blue band-member Simon Webbe's second solo album, Grace. The track was first premiered on 12 December 2006 through Webbe's official website. The B-side for the single is a cover version of The Killers first single, "When You Were Young", recorded live on the BBC Radio 1 Live Lounge. The single was only released in the UK and the Netherlands, the latter due to notable airplay and live performances by Webbe in the country. The single subsequently peaked at #38 on the Dutch Singles Chart. The single failed to enter the UK Top 100 upon its release via iTunes in January 2007, but managed to peak at #45 upon its physical release.

Track listing
 "My Soul Pleads For You" - 3:05
 "When You Were Young" - 2:57

Charts

References

2007 singles
Simon Webbe songs
2006 songs